The 1965–66 Weber State Wildcats men's basketball team represented Weber State College during the 1965–66 NCAA University Division basketball season. In the third season of the Big Sky Conference, the Wildcats were led by sixth-year head coach Dick Motta and played their home games on campus at Wildcat Gym in Ogden, Utah.

Weber State and Gonzaga were co-champions of the Big Sky; it did not yet have an automatic berth to the 22-team NCAA tournament, which came two years later. The conference tournament was a full decade away.

References

External links
Sports Reference – Weber State Wildcats: 1965–66 basketball season
2015–16 Media Guide: 1965–66 season

Weber State Wildcats men's basketball seasons
Weber State